Yankee Springs may refer to:
Yankee Springs Recreation Area
Yankee Springs Township, Michigan